Altrincham railway station served the town of Altrincham (historically in Cheshire), now Greater Manchester, England between 1849 and 1881.

The station was built by the Manchester, South Junction and Altrincham Railway (MSJ&AR) and opened on 20 July 1849.

This first Altrincham station was located just south of Stockport Road level crossing and its junction with Stamford Street. The station consisted of two platforms and a station building. It served the locality until 3 April 1881 when both it and Bowdon railway station were closed, being replaced by the new large facility named Altrincham and Bowdon (now Altrincham railway station), situated between the two former stations.

There are no remains of this station today.

References

Disused railway stations in Trafford
Former Manchester, South Junction and Altrincham Railway stations
Railway stations in Great Britain opened in 1849
Railway stations in Great Britain closed in 1881
Altrincham
1849 establishments in England